Billel Mebarki (born 10 January 1989) is a retired Algerian football striker.

References

1991 births
Living people
Algerian footballers
ASM Oran players
JSM Béjaïa players
USM El Harrach players
MO Béjaïa players
JS Kabylie players
USM Bel Abbès players
Association football forwards
Algerian Ligue Professionnelle 1 players
21st-century Algerian people